Dance Club Massacre was an American deathcore band from Chicago, Illinois. Formed in 2004, the group originated as a simple recording project between founding members Nick Seger and Kurt Latos. After recording three songs described as "Halloween-core" and distributing them to friends, the project became a complete band when friends began rehearsals with one another all while attending college.

Dance Club Massacre consisted of Nick Seger (lead vocals), Jon Caruso (drums), Chris Mrozek (bass guitar), Mitch Hein (guitar) and Matt Hynek (keyboards). They are currently signed to Metal Blade Records, and its division, Black Market Activities.

History 
Dance Club Massacre originated in Lansing, Illinois in 2004 as a duo consisting of Nick Seger and Kurt Latos before acquiring the line-up of a full band consisting of friends, many of which were college students. The band recorded their first demo in early 2005 at Blam Recording in Chicago, which was just simply titled Demo, with producer, Eric Butkus. The demo had seven tracks and 150 hand pressed copies were issued. These copies of the demo were sold at shows and through their Myspace profile. Shortly after the release of the demo, Matt Hynek took Kurt Latos' place as keyboardist.

By April 2006, all copies of the demo were sold out, which then had Dance Club Massacre record their debut full-length album, Feast of the Blood Monsters with the same engineer that recorded their demo. Six of the seven tracks that were on the demo were re-recorded for the album. Feast of the Blood Monsters was self-released and 1,100 copies were made in real packaging, which were sold at local indie record stores, shows, and on Interpunk. The album has stayed in Interpunk's top 50 items ever since it was released. They then played at 2006's Warped Tour. After being noticed by Black Market Activities, they were signed to the label and their debut album was re-issued through Black Market and Metal Blade with heightened production and different cover art.

During 2008, the band traveled to Syracuse, New York to record their second album, Circle of Death with Jason Randall at More Sound Studios.

Since 2009, the band have been rather inactive, while their Facebook page is updated occasionally with pictures of the members grouped together in rehearsals, they still have not played a single show since 2009, but at the same time have not denied the possibility of a reunion.

Musical style, influences and concept
Dance Club Massacre generally have an experimental musical style, which is ultimately influenced by many extreme metal and metalcore musical groups. The band's influences include groups such as, Dimmu Borgir, Cradle of Filth, An Albatross, The Locust, Daughters, Converge, Horse the Band, Fantomas, Pig Destroyer and Between the Buried and Me. They even incorporate influence from indie rock musical styles. Their lyrical themes usually focus on subjects such as partying, girls, alcohol and enjoying life in general rather than the morbid or aggressive themes extreme metal bands traditionally employ.

Genre-wise, the band have been said to include a vast variety of genres into their music including experimental metal, black metal, death metal, grindcore, math rock, post-hardcore, and thrash metal. However, they are primarily recognized as a deathcore band.

Band members
 Final lineup 
 Nick Seger – vocals (2004-2010)
 Mitch Hein – guitars (2004-2010)
 Matt Hynek – keyboards, synthesizer (2005-2010)
 Chris Mrozek – bass (2004-2010)
 Jon Caruso – drums (2004-2010)

 Former Memberøs
 Kurt Latos – keyboards, synthesizer (2004)
 James Poston – bass (2004-2005)

Timeline

Discography
 Studio albums
 Feast of the Blood Monsters (2006)
 Circle of Death (2008)
 Demos
 Demo (self-released, 2005)

References

External links 
 
 

American deathcore musical groups
American mathcore musical groups
American avant-garde metal musical groups
Black Market Activities artists
Heavy metal musical groups from Illinois
Math rock groups
Metal Blade Records artists
Musical groups disestablished in 2010
Musical groups established in 2004
Musical groups from Chicago
Musical quintets